Henri Cartier-Bresson (22 August 1908 – 3 August 2004) was a French humanist photographer considered a master of candid photography, and an early user of 35mm film. He pioneered the genre of street photography, and viewed photography as capturing a decisive moment.

Cartier-Bresson was one of the founding members of Magnum Photos in 1947. In the 1970s, he took up drawing—he had studied painting in the 1920s.

Early life
Henri Cartier-Bresson was born in Chanteloup-en-Brie, Seine-et-Marne, France. His father was a wealthy textile manufacturer, whose Cartier-Bresson thread was a staple of French sewing kits. His mother's family were cotton merchants and landowners from Normandy, where Henri spent part of his childhood. His mother was descended from Charlotte Corday.

The Cartier-Bresson family lived in a bourgeois neighborhood in Paris, Rue de Lisbonne, near Place de l'Europe and Parc Monceau. Since his parents were providing financial support,  Henri pursued photography more freely than his contemporaries. Henri also sketched.

Young Henri took holiday snapshots with a Box Brownie; he later experimented with a 3×4 inch view camera. He was raised in traditional French bourgeois fashion, and was required to address his parents with formal vous rather than tu. His father assumed that his son would take up the family business, but Henri was strong-willed and also feared this prospect.

Cartier-Bresson attended École Fénelon, a Catholic school that prepared students for the Lycée Condorcet. A governess called "Miss Kitty" who came from across the Channel, instilled in him the love of - and competence in - the English language. The proctor caught him reading a book by Rimbaud or Mallarmé, and reprimanded him, "Let's have no disorder in your studies!". Cartier-Bresson said, "He used the informal 'tu', which usually meant you were about to get a good thrashing. But he went on, 'You're going to read in my office.' Well, that wasn't an offer he had to repeat."

Painting
After trying to learn music, Cartier-Bresson was introduced to oil painting by his uncle Louis, a gifted painter. But the painting lessons were cut short when uncle Louis was killed in World War I.

In 1927, Cartier-Bresson entered a private art school and the Lhote Academy, the Parisian studio of the Cubist painter and sculptor André Lhote. Lhote's ambition was to integrate the Cubists' approach to reality with classical artistic forms; he wanted to link the French classical tradition of Nicolas Poussin and Jacques-Louis David to Modernism. Cartier-Bresson also studied painting with society portraitist Jacques Émile Blanche.

During that period, he read Dostoevsky, Schopenhauer, Rimbaud, Nietzsche, Mallarmé, Freud, Proust, Joyce, Hegel, Engels and Marx. Lhote took his pupils to the Louvre to study classical artists and to Paris galleries to study contemporary art. Cartier-Bresson's interest in modern art was combined with an admiration for the works of the Renaissance masters: Jan van Eyck, Paolo Uccello, Masaccio, Piero della Francesca. Cartier-Bresson regarded Lhote as his teacher of "photography without a camera."

Surrealists photography influence
Although Cartier-Bresson became frustrated with Lhote's "rule-laden" approach to art, the rigorous theoretical training later helped him identify and resolve problems of artistic form and composition in photography. In the 1920s, schools of photographic realism were popping up throughout Europe but each had a different view on the direction photography should take.  The Surrealist movement, founded in 1924, was a catalyst for this paradigm shift. Cartier-Bresson began socializing with the Surrealists at the Café Cyrano, in the Place Blanche. He met a number of the movement's leading protagonists, and was drawn to the Surrealist movement's technique of using the subconscious and the immediate to influence their work. The historian Peter Galassi explains:

Cartier-Bresson matured artistically in this stormy cultural and political atmosphere. But, although he knew the concepts, he couldn't express them; dissatisfied with his experiments, he destroyed most of his early paintings.

Cambridge and army
From 1928 to 1929, Cartier-Bresson studied art, literature, and English at the University of Cambridge, where he became bilingual. In 1930 he was conscripted into the French Army and stationed at Le Bourget near Paris, a time about which he later remarked: "And I had quite a hard time of it, too, because I was toting Joyce under my arm and a Lebel rifle on my shoulder."

Receives first camera 

In 1929, Cartier-Bresson's air squadron commandant placed him under house arrest for hunting without a licence. Cartier-Bresson met American expatriate Harry Crosby at Le Bourget, who persuaded the commandant to release Cartier-Bresson into his custody for a few days. The two men both had an interest in photography, and Harry presented Henri with his first camera. They spent their time together taking and printing pictures at Crosby's home, Le Moulin du Soleil (The Sun Mill), near Paris in Ermenonville, France. Crosby later said Cartier-Bresson "looked like a fledgling, shy and frail, and mild as whey." Embracing the open sexuality offered by Crosby and his wife Caresse, Cartier-Bresson fell into an intense sexual relationship with her that lasted until 1931.

Escape to Africa
Two years after Harry Crosby died by suicide, Cartier-Bresson's affair with Caresse Crosby ended in 1931, leaving him broken-hearted. During conscription he read Conrad's Heart of Darkness. This gave him the idea of escaping and finding adventure on the Côte d'Ivoire in French colonial Africa. He survived by shooting game and selling it to local villagers. From hunting, he learned methods which he later used in photography.  On the Côte d'Ivoire, he contracted blackwater fever, which nearly killed him. While still feverish, he sent instructions to his grandfather for his own funeral, asking to be buried in Normandy, at the edge of the Eawy Forest while Debussy's String Quartet was played. Although Cartier-Bresson took a portable camera (smaller than a Brownie Box) to Côte d'Ivoire, only seven photographs survived the tropics.

Photography

Returning to France, Cartier-Bresson recuperated in Marseille in late 1931 and deepened his relationship with the Surrealists. He became inspired by a 1930 photograph by Hungarian photojournalist Martin Munkacsi showing three naked young African boys, caught in near-silhouette, running into the surf of Lake Tanganyika. Titled Three Boys at Lake Tanganyika, this captured the freedom, grace and spontaneity of their movement and their joy at being alive. That photograph inspired him to stop painting and to take up photography seriously. He explained, "I suddenly understood that a photograph could fix eternity in an instant."

He acquired the Leica camera with 50 mm lens in Marseilles that would accompany him for many years. The anonymity that the small camera gave him in a crowd or during an intimate moment was essential in overcoming the formal and unnatural behavior of those who were aware of being photographed. He enhanced his anonymity by painting all shiny parts of the Leica with black paint. The Leica opened up new possibilities in photography—the ability to capture the world in its actual state of movement and transformation. Restless, he photographed in Berlin, Brussels, Warsaw, Prague, Budapest and Madrid. His photographs were first exhibited at the Julien Levy Gallery in New York in 1933, and subsequently at the Ateneo Club in Madrid. In 1934 in Mexico, he shared an exhibition with Manuel Álvarez Bravo. In the beginning, he did not photograph much in his native France. It would be years before he photographed there extensively.

In 1934, Cartier-Bresson met a young Polish intellectual, a photographer named David Szymin who was called "Chim" because his name was difficult to pronounce. Szymin later changed his name to David Seymour. The two had much in common culturally. Through Chim, Cartier-Bresson met a Hungarian photographer named Endré Friedmann, who later changed his name to Robert Capa.

United States exhibits

Cartier-Bresson traveled to the United States in 1935 with an invitation to exhibit his work at New York's Julien Levy Gallery. He shared display space with fellow photographers Walker Evans and Manuel Álvarez Bravo. Carmel Snow of Harper's Bazaar gave him a fashion assignment, but he fared poorly since he had no idea how to direct or interact with the models. Nevertheless, Snow was the first American editor to publish Cartier-Bresson's photographs in a magazine. While in New York, he met photographer Paul Strand, who did camerawork for the Depression-era documentary The Plow That Broke the Plains.

Filmmaking

When he returned to France, Cartier-Bresson applied for a job with renowned French film director Jean Renoir. He acted in Renoir's 1936 film Partie de campagne and in the 1939 La Règle du jeu, for which he played a butler and served as second assistant. Renoir made Cartier-Bresson act so he could understand how it felt to be on the other side of the camera. Cartier-Bresson also helped Renoir make a film for the Communist party on the 200 families, including his own, who ran France. During the Spanish civil war, Cartier-Bresson co-directed an anti-fascist film with Herbert Kline, to promote the Republican medical services.

Photojournalism start
Cartier-Bresson's first photojournalist photos to be published came in 1937 when he covered the coronation of King George VI and Queen Elizabeth, for the French weekly Regards. He focused on the new monarch's adoring subjects lining the London streets, and took no pictures of the king. His photo credit read "Cartier", as he was hesitant to use his full family name.

Marriage
In 1937, Cartier-Bresson married a Javanese dancer, Ratna Mohini. They lived in a fourth-floor servants' flat in Paris at 19, rue Neuve-des-Petits-Champs (now rue Danielle Casanova), a large studio with a small bedroom, kitchen, and bathroom where Cartier-Bresson developed film. Between 1937 and 1939, Cartier-Bresson worked as a photographer for the French Communists' evening paper, Ce soir. With Chim and Capa, Cartier-Bresson was a leftist, but he did not join the French Communist party. In 1967, he was divorced from Ratna "Elie".

In 1970 Cartier-Bresson married Magnum photographer Martine Franck [25] and in May 1972, the couple had a daughter, Mélanie.

World War II service
When World War II broke out in September 1939, Cartier-Bresson joined the French Army as a Corporal in the Film and Photo unit. During the Battle of France, in June 1940 at St. Dié in the Vosges Mountains, he was captured by German soldiers and spent 35 months in prisoner-of-war camps doing forced labor under the Nazis. He twice tried and failed to escape from the prison camp, and was punished by solitary confinement. His third escape was successful and he hid on a farm in Touraine before getting false papers that allowed him to travel in France. In France, he worked for the underground, aiding other escapees and working secretly with other photographers to cover the Occupation and then the Liberation of France. In 1943, he dug up his beloved Leica camera, which he had buried in farmland near Vosges. At the end of the war he was asked by the American Office of War Information to make a documentary, Le Retour (The Return) about returning French prisoners and displaced persons.

Toward the end of the War, rumors had reached America that Cartier-Bresson had been killed. His film on returning war refugees (released in the United States in 1947) spurred a retrospective of his work at the Museum of Modern Art (MoMA) instead of the posthumous show that MoMA had been preparing. The show debuted in 1947 together with the publication of his first book, The Photographs of Henri Cartier-Bresson. Lincoln Kirstein and Beaumont Newhall wrote the book's text.

Magnum Photos
In early 1947, Cartier-Bresson, with Robert Capa, David Seymour, William Vandivert and George Rodger founded Magnum Photos. Capa's brainchild, Magnum was a cooperative picture agency owned by its members. The team split photo assignments among the members. Rodger, who had quit Life in London after covering World War II, would cover Africa and the Middle East. Chim, who spoke a variety of European languages, would work in Europe. Cartier-Bresson would be assigned to India and China. Vandivert, who had also left Life, would work in America, and Capa would work anywhere that had an assignment. Maria Eisner managed the Paris office and Rita Vandivert, Vandivert's wife, managed the New York office and became Magnum's first president.

Cartier-Bresson achieved international recognition for his coverage of Gandhi's funeral in India in 1948 and the last stage of the Chinese Civil War in 1949. He covered the last six months of the Kuomintang administration and the first six months of the Maoist People's Republic.  He also photographed the last surviving Imperial eunuchs in Beijing, as the city was being liberated by the communists. In Shanghai, he often worked in the company of photojournalist Sam Tata, whom Cartier-Bresson had previously befriended in Bombay. From China, he went on to Dutch East Indies (Indonesia), where he documented the gaining of independence from the Dutch. In 1950, Cartier-Bresson had traveled to the South India. He had visited Tiruvannamalai, a town in the Indian State of Tamil Nadu and photographed the last moments of Ramana Maharishi, Sri Ramana Ashram and its surroundings. A few days later he also visited and photographed Sri Aurobindo, Mother and Sri Aurobindo Ashram, Pondicherry.

Magnum's mission was to "feel the pulse" of the times and some of its first projects were People Live Everywhere, Youth of the World, Women of the World and The Child Generation. Magnum aimed to use photography in the service of humanity, and provided arresting, widely viewed images.

The Decisive Moment

In 1952, Cartier-Bresson published his book Images à la sauvette, whose English-language edition was titled The Decisive Moment, although the French language title actually translates as "images on the sly" or "hastily taken images", Images à la sauvette included a portfolio of 126 of his photos from the East and the West. The book's cover was drawn by Henri Matisse. For his 4,500-word philosophical preface, Cartier-Bresson took his keynote text from the 17th century Cardinal de Retz, "Il n'y a rien dans ce monde qui n'ait un moment decisif" ("There is nothing in this world that does not have a decisive moment"). Cartier-Bresson applied this to his photographic style. He said: "Photographier: c'est dans un même instant et en une fraction de seconde reconnaître un fait et l'organisation rigoureuse de formes perçues visuellement qui expriment et signifient ce fait" ("To me, photography is the simultaneous recognition, in a fraction of a second, of the significance of an event as well as of a precise organization of forms which give that event its proper expression.").

Both titles came from Tériade, the Greek-born French publisher whom Cartier-Bresson admired. He gave the book its French title, Images à la Sauvette, loosely translated as "images on the run" or "stolen images." Dick Simon of Simon & Schuster came up with the English title The Decisive Moment. Margot Shore, Magnum's Paris bureau chief, translated Cartier-Bresson's French preface into English.

"Photography is not like painting," Cartier-Bresson told the Washington Post in 1957. "There is a creative fraction of a second when you are taking a picture. Your eye must see a composition or an expression that life itself offers you, and you must know with intuition when to click the camera. That is the moment the photographer is creative," he said. "Oop! The Moment! Once you miss it, it is gone forever."

The photo Rue Mouffetard, Paris, taken in 1954, has since become a classic example of Cartier-Bresson's ability to capture a decisive moment. He held his first exhibition in France at the Pavillon de Marsan in 1955.

Later career
Cartier-Bresson's photography took him to many places, including China, Mexico, Canada, the United States, India, Japan, Portugal and the Soviet Union. He became the first Western photographer to photograph "freely" in the post-war Soviet Union.

In 1962, on behalf of Vogue, he went to Sardinia for about twenty days. There he visited Nuoro, Oliena, Orgosolo Mamoiada Desulo, Orosei, Cala Gonone, Orani (hosted by his friend Costantino Nivola), San Leonardo di Siete Fuentes, and Cagliari.

Cartier-Bresson withdrew as a principal of Magnum (which still distributes his photographs) in 1966 to concentrate on portraiture and landscapes.

In 1967, he was divorced from his first wife of 30 years, Ratna (known as "Elie"). In 1968, he began to turn away from photography and return to his passion for drawing and painting. He admitted that perhaps he had said all he could through photography. He married Magnum photographer Martine Franck, thirty years younger than himself, in 1970. The couple had a daughter, Mélanie, in May 1972.

Cartier-Bresson retired from photography in the early 1970s, and by 1975 no longer took pictures other than an occasional private portrait; he said he kept his camera in a safe at his house and rarely took it out. He returned to drawing, mainly using pencil, pen and ink, and to painting. He held his first exhibition of drawings at the Carlton Gallery in New York in 1975.

Death and legacy
Cartier-Bresson died in Céreste (Alpes-de-Haute-Provence, France) on August 3, 2004, aged 95. No cause of death was announced. He was buried in the local cemetery nearby in Montjustin and was survived by his wife, Martine Franck, and daughter, Mélanie.

Cartier-Bresson spent more than three decades on assignment for Life and other journals. He traveled without bounds, documenting some of the great upheavals of the 20th century — the Spanish Civil War, the liberation of Paris in 1944, the fall of the Kuomintang in China to the communists, the assassination of Mahatma Gandhi, the May 1968 events in Paris, the Berlin Wall. And along the way he paused to document portraits of Camus, Picasso, Colette, Matisse, Pound and Giacometti. But many of his most renowned photographs, such as Behind the Gare Saint-Lazare, are of seemingly unimportant moments of ordinary daily life.

Cartier-Bresson did not like to be photographed and treasured his privacy. Photographs of Cartier-Bresson are scant. When he accepted an honorary degree from Oxford University in 1975, he held a paper in front of his face to avoid being photographed.
In a Charlie Rose interview in 2000, Cartier-Bresson noted that it wasn't necessarily that he hated to be photographed, but it was that he was embarrassed by the notion of being photographed for being famous.

Cartier-Bresson believed that what went on beneath the surface was nobody's business but his own. He did recall that he once confided his innermost secrets to a Paris taxi driver, certain that he would never meet the man again.

In 2003, he created the Henri Cartier-Bresson Foundation in Paris with his wife, the Belgian photographer Martine Franck and his daughter to preserve and share his legacy. In 2018, the foundation relocated from the Montparnasse district to Le Marais.

The highest price reached by one of his photographs was when Behind the Gare Saint-Lazare sold at Christie's, on November 17, 2011, by $590,455.

Cinéma vérité
Cartier-Bresson's photographs were also influential in the development of cinéma vérité film. In particular, he is credited as the inspiration for the National Film Board of Canada's early work in this genre with its 1958 Candid Eye series.

Technique
Cartier-Bresson almost always used a Leica 35 mm rangefinder camera fitted with a normal 50 mm lens, or occasionally a wide-angle lens for landscapes. He often wrapped black tape around the camera's chrome body to make it less conspicuous. With fast black and white film and sharp lenses, he was able to photograph events unnoticed. No longer bound by a 4×5 press camera or a medium format twin-lens reflex camera, miniature-format cameras gave Cartier-Bresson what he called "the velvet hand...the hawk's eye."

He never photographed with flash, a practice he saw as "impolite...like coming to a concert with a pistol in your hand."

He believed in composing his photographs in the viewfinder, not in the darkroom. He showcased this belief by having nearly all his photographs printed only at full-frame and completely free of any cropping or other darkroom manipulation. He insisted that his prints be left uncropped so as to include a few millimeters of the unexposed negative around the image area, resulting in a black frame around the developed picture.

Cartier-Bresson worked exclusively in black and white, other than a few experiments in color. He disliked developing or making his own prints and showed a considerable lack of interest in the process of photography in general, likening photography with the small camera to an "instant drawing". Technical aspects of photography were valid for him only where they allowed him to express what he saw:

He started a tradition of testing new camera lenses by taking photographs of ducks in urban parks. He never published the images but referred to them as 'my only superstition' as he considered it a 'baptism' of the lens.

Cartier-Bresson is regarded as one of the art world's most unassuming personalities. He disliked publicity and exhibited a ferocious shyness since his days of hiding from the Nazis during World War II. Although he took many famous portraits, his face was little known to the world at large. This, presumably, helped allow him to work on the street undisturbed. He denied that the term "art" applied to his photographs. Instead, he thought that they were merely his gut reactions to fleeting situations that he had happened upon.

Publications
 1947: The Photographs of Henri Cartier-Bresson. Text by Lincoln Kirstein. New York: Museum of Modern Art.
 1952: The Decisive Moment. Texts and photographs by Cartier-Bresson. Cover by Henri Matisse. New York: Simon & Schuster. French edition
2014: Göttingen: Steidl. . Facsimile edition. First edition, 2014. Third edition, 2018. Includes booklet with an essay by Clément Chéroux, "A Bible for Photographers".
 1954: Les Danses à Bali. Texts by Antonin Artaud on Balinese theater and commentary by Béryl de Zoete Paris: Delpire. German edition.
 1955: The Europeans. Text and photographs by Cartier-Bresson. Cover by Joan Miró. New York: Simon & Schuster. French edition.
 1955: People of Moscow. London: Thames & Hudson. French, German and Italian editions.
 1956: China in Transition. London: Thames & Hudson. French, German and Italian editions.
 1958: Henri Cartier-Bresson: Fotografie. Prague and Bratislava: Statni nakladatelstvi krasné. Text by Anna Farova.
 1963: Photographs by Henri Cartier-Bresson. New York: Grossman Publisher. French, English, Japanese and Swiss editions.
 1964: China. Photographs and notes on fifteen months spent in China. Text by Barbara Miller. New York: Bantam. French edition.
 1966: Henri Cartier-Bresson and the Artless Art. Text by Jean-Pierre Montier. Translated from the French L'Art sans art d'Henri Cartier-Bresson by Ruth Taylor.  New York: Bulfinch Press.
 1968: The World of HCB. New York: Viking Press. French, German and Swiss editions. 
 1969: Man and Machine. Commissioned by IBM. French, German, Italian and Spanish editions.
 1970: France. Text by François Nourissier. London: Thames & Hudson. French and German editions.
 1972: The Face of Asia. Introduction by Robert Shaplen. New York and Tokyo: John Weatherhill; Hong Kong: Orientations. French edition.
 1973: About Russia. London: Thames & Hudson. French, German and Swiss editions.
 1976: Henri Cartier-Bresson. Texts by Cartier-Bresson. History of Photography Series. History of Photography Series. French, German, Italian, Japanese and Italian editions.
 1979: Henri Cartier-Bresson Photographer. Text by Yves Bonnefoy. New York: Bulfinch. French, English, German, Japanese and Italian editions. 
 1983: Henri Cartier-Bresson. Ritratti = Henri Cartier-Bresson. Portraits. Texts by André Pieyre de Mandiargues and Ferdinando Scianna, "I Grandi Fotografi". Milan: Gruppo Editoriale Fabbri. English and Spanish editions.
 1985:
 Henri Cartier-Bresson en Inde. Introduction by Satyajit Ray, photographs and notes by Cartier-Bresson. Text by Yves Véquaud. Paris: Centre national de la photographie. English edition.
 Photoportraits. Texts by André Pieyre de Mandiargues. London: Thames & Hudson. French and German editions.
 1987:
 Henri Cartier-Bresson. The Early Work. Texts by Peter Galassi. New York: Museum of Modern Art. French edition. 
 Henri Cartier-Bresson in India. Introduction by Satyajit Ray, photographs and notes by Cartier-Bresson, texts by Yves Véquaud. London: Thames & Hudson. French edition.
 1989:
 L'Autre Chine. Introduction by Robert Guillain. Collection Photo Notes. Paris: Centre National de la Photographie.
 Line by Line. Henri Cartier-Bresson's drawings. Introduction by Jean Clair and John Russell. London: Thames & Hudson. French and German editions.
 1991:
 America in Passing. Introduction by Gilles Mora. New York: Bulfinch. French, English, German, Italian, Portuguese and Danish editions.
 Alberto Giacometti photographié par Henri Cartier-Bresson. Texts by Cartier-Bresson and Louis Clayeux. Milan: Franco Sciardelli.
 1994:
 A propos de Paris. Texts by Véra Feyder and André Pieyre de Mandiargues. London: Thames & Hudson. French, German and Japanese editions. 
 Double regard. Drawings and photographs. Texts by Jean Leymarie. Amiens: Le Nyctalope. French and English editions.
 Mexican Notebooks 1934–1964. Text by Carlos Fuentes. London: Thames & Hudson. French, Italian, and German editions.
 L'Art sans art. Text de Jean-Pierre Montier. Paris: Editions Flammarion. English, German and Italian editions.
 1996: L'Imaginaire d'après nature. Text by Cartier-Bresson. Paris: Fata Morgana. German and English editions'
 1997: Europeans. Texts by Jean Clair. London: Thames & Hudson. French, German, Italian and Portuguese editions.
 1998: Tête à tête. Texts by Ernst H. Gombrich. London: Thames & Hudson. French, German, Italian and Portuguese editions.
 1999: The Mind's Eye. Text by Cartier-Bresson. New York: Aperture. French and German editions.
 1999: Henri Cartier-Bresson: A Biography. Text by Pierre Assouline, translated by David Wilson. London: Thames and Hudson.
 2001: Landscape Townscape. Texts by Erik Orsenna and Gérard Macé. London: Thames & Hudson. French, German and Italian editions.
 2003: The Man, the Image and the World. Texts by Philippe Arbaizar, Jean Clair, Claude Cookman, Robert Delpire, Jean Leymarie, Jean-Noel Jeanneney and Serge Toubiana. London: Thames & Hudson, 2003. German, French, Korean, Italian and Spanish editions.
 2005:
Henri Cartier-Bresson: The Mind's Eye: Writings on Photography and Photographers, Aperture; 1st edition. 
Henri Cartier-Bresson: Masters of Photography Series, Aperture; Third edition. 
 2006: An Inner SIlence: The portraits of Henri Cartier-Bresson, New York: Thames & Hudson. Texts by Agnès Sire and Jean-Luc Nancy.
 2010: Henri Cartier-Bresson: The Modern Century, The Museum of Modern Art, New York; Reprint edition. 
 2015: Henri Cartier-Bresson: The Decisive Moment, Steidl; Pck Slp Ha edition. 
 2017: Henri Cartier-Bresson Fotógrafo. Delpire.

Filmography

Films directed by Cartier-Bresson
Cartier-Bresson was second assistant director to Jean Renoir in 1936 for La vie est à nous and Une partie de campagne, and in 1939 for La Règle du Jeu.

 1937: Victoire de la vie. Documentary on the hospitals of Republican Spain: Running time: 49 minutes. Black and white.
 1938:  L’Espagne Vivra. Documentary on the Spanish Civil War and the post-war period. Running time: 43 minutes and 32 seconds. Black and white.
 1938 Avec la brigade Abraham Lincoln en Espagne, Henri Cartier-Bresson ja Herbert Kline. Running time 21 minutes. Black and white.
 1944–45: Le Retour. Documentary on prisoners of war and detainees. Running time: 32 minutes and 37 seconds. Black and white.
 1969–70: Impressions of California. Running time: 23 minutes and 20 seconds. Color.
 1969–70: Southern Exposures. Running time: 22 minutes and 25 seconds. Color.

Films compiled from photographs by Cartier-Bresson
  1956: A Travers le Monde avec Henri Cartier-Bresson. Directed by Jean-Marie Drot and Henri Cartier-Bresson. Running time: 21 minutes. Black and white.
  1963: Midlands at Play and at Work. Produced by ABC Television, London. Running time : 19 minutes. Black and white.
  1963–65: Five fifteen-minute films on Germany for the Süddeutscher Rundfunk, Munich.
  1967: Flagrants délits. Directed by Robert Delpire. Original music score by Diego Masson. Delpire production, Paris. Running time: 22 minutes. Black and white.
  1969: Québec vu par Cartier-Bresson / Le Québec as seen by Cartier-Bresson. Directed by Wolff Kœnig. Produced by the Canadian Film Board. Running time: 10 minutes. Black and white.
  1970: Images de France.
  1991: Contre l'oubli : Lettre à Mamadou Bâ, Mauritanie. Short film directed by Martine Franck for Amnesty International. Editing : Roger Ikhlef. Running time: 3 minutes. Black and white.
  1992: Henri Cartier-Bresson dessins et photos. Director: Annick Alexandre. Short film produced by FR3 Dijon, commentary by the artist. Running time: 2 minutes and 33 seconds. Color.
  1997: Série "100 photos du siècle": L'Araignée d'amour: broadcast by Arte. Produced by Capa Télévision. Running time: 6 minutes and 15 seconds. Color.

Films about Cartier-Bresson
 "Henri Cartier-Bresson, point d'interrogation" by Sarah Moon, screened at Rencontres d'Arles festival in 1994
 Henri Cartier-Bresson: L'amour Tout Court (70 mins, 2001. Interviews with Cartier-Bresson.)
 Henri Cartier-Bresson: The Impassioned Eye (72 mins, 2006. Late interviews with Cartier-Bresson.)

Exhibitions

 1933 Cercle Ateneo, Madrid
 1933 Julien Levy Gallery, New York
 1934 Palacio de Bellas Artes, Mexico City (with Manuel Alvarez Bravo)
 1947 Museum of Modern Art, New York, Martin-Gropius-Bau, Berlin, Germany; Museum of Modern Art, Rome, Italy; Dean Gallery, Edinburgh; Museum of Modern Art, New York City; Museo Nacional de Bellas Artes, Santiago, Chile
 1952 Institute of Contemporary Arts, London
 1955 Retrospektive – Musée des Arts décoratifs, Paris
 1956   Photokina, Cologne, Germany
 1963 Photokina, Cologne, Germany
 1964 The Phillips Collection, Washington
 1965–1967 2nd retrospective, Tokyo, Musée des Arts Décoratifs, Paris, New York, London, Amsterdam, Rome, Zurich, Cologne and other cities.
 1970 En France – Grand Palais, Paris. Later in the US, USSR, Australia and Japan
 1971 Les Rencontres d'Arles festival. Movies screened at Théatre Antique.
 1972 Les Rencontres d'Arles festival. "Flagrant Délit " (Production Delpire) screened at Théatre Antique.
 1974 Exhibition about the USSR, International Center of Photography, New York
 1974–1997 Galerie Claude Bernard, Paris
 1975 Carlton Gallery, New York
 1975 Galerie Bischofberger, Zurich, Switzerland
 1980 Brooklyn Museum, New York 
 1980 Photographs, Art Institute of Chicago 
 1980 Portraits – Galerie Eric Franck, Geneva, Switzerland
 1981 Musée d'Art Moderne de la Ville de Paris, France
 1982 Hommage à Henri Cartier-Bresson – Centre National de la Photographie, Palais de Tokyo, Paris
 1983 Printemps Ginza – Tokyo
 1984 Osaka University of Arts, Japan
 1984–1985 Paris à vue d’œil – Musée Carnavalet, Paris
 1985 Henri Cartier-Bresson en Inde – Centre National de la Photographie, Palais de Tokyo, Paris
 1985 Museo de Arte Moderno de México, Mexico
 1986 L'Institut Français de Stockholm
 1986 Pavillon d'Arte contemporanea, Milan, Italy
 1986 Tor Vergata University, Rome, Italy
 1987   Museum of Modern Art, Oxford, UK (drawings and photography)
 1987 Early Photographs – Museum of Modern Art, New York
 1988 Institut Français, Athen, Greece
 1988 Palais Lichtenstein, Vienna, Austria
 1988 Salzburger Landessammlung, Austria
 1988 Group exhibition: "Magnum en Chine" at Rencontres d'Arles, France.
 1989 Chapelle de l'École des Beaux-Arts, Paris
 1989   Fondation Pierre Gianadda, Martigny, Switzerland (drawings and photographs)
 1989 Mannheimer Kunstverein, Mannheim, Germany (drawings and photography)
 1989 Printemps Ginza, Tokyo, Japan
 1990 Galerie Arnold Herstand, New York
 1991 Taipei Fine Arts Museum, Taiwan (drawings and photographs)
 1992 Centro de Exposiciones, Saragossa and Logrono, Spain
 1992 Hommage à Henri Cartier-Bresson – International Center of Photography, New York
 1992 L'Amérique – FNAC, Paris
 1992 Musée de Noyers-sur-Serein, France
 1992 Palazzo San Vitale, Parma, Italy
 1993 Photo Dessin – Dessin Photo, Arles, France
 1994  "Henri Cartier-Bresson, point d'interrogation" by Sarah Moon screened at Rencontres d'Arles festival, France.
 1994 Dessins et premières photos – La Caridad, Barcelona, Spain
 1995 Dessins et Hommage à Henri Cartier-Bresson – CRAC (Centre Régional d’Art Contemporain) Valence, Drome, France
 1996 Henri Cartier-Bresson: Pen, Brush and Cameras – The Minneapolis Institute of Arts, US
 1997 Les Européens – Maison Européenne de la Photographie, Paris
 1997 Henri Cartier-Bresson, dessins – Musée des Beaux-Arts, Montreal
 1998 Galerie Beyeler, Basel, Switzerland
 1998 Galerie Löhrl, Mönchengladbach, Germany
 1998 Howard Greenberg Gallery, New York
 1998 Kunsthaus Zürich, Zurich, Switzerland
 1998 Kunstverein für die Rheinlande und Westfalen, Düsseldorf, Germany
 1998 Line by Line – Royal College of Art, London
 1998 Tête à Tête – National Portrait Gallery, London 
 1998–1999 Photographien und Zeichnungen – Baukunst Galerie, Cologne, Germany
 2003–2005 Rétrospective, Bibliothèque nationale de France, Paris; La Caixa, Barcelona; Martin Gropius Bau, Berlin; Museum of Modern Art, Rome; Dean Gallery, Edinburgh; Museum of Modern Art, New York; Museo Nacional de Bellas Artes, Santiago, Chile
 2004 Baukunst Galerie, Cologne
 2004 Martin-Gropius-Bau, Berlin
 2004 Museum Ludwig, Cologne
 2008 Henri Cartier-Bresson's Scrapbook Photographs 1932–46, National Media Museum, Bradford, UK
 2008 National Gallery of Modern Art, Mumbai, India
 2008 Santa Catalina Castle, Cadiz, Spain
 2009 Musée de l'Art Moderne, Paris
 2010 Museum of Modern Art, New York 
 2010 The Art Institute of Chicago, Chicago
 2011   Museum of Design Zürich
 2011   High Museum of Art, Atlanta, GA
 2011   Maison de la Photo, Toulon, France
 2011   Kunstmuseum Wolfsburg, Germany
 2011   Queensland Art Gallery, Brisbane, Australia
 2011-2012 KunstHausWien, Vienna, Austria
 2014   Centre Georges Pompidou, Paris.
 2015   Palacio de Bellas Artes, Mexico City
 2015   Ateneum, Helsinki
 2017 Leica Gallery, San Francisco.
 2017 Museo Botero/Banco de la Republica, Bogota Colombia
 2018 International Center of Photography, New York 
 2021 Le Grand jeu, Bibliothèque Nationale de France, Paris, France
 2022 Cina 1948-49/1958, MUDEC, Milan, Italy 
 2022 L'expérience du paysage, Fondation Henri Cartier-Bresson, Paris, France

Public collections
Cartier-Bresson's work is held in the following public collections:
 Bibliothèque Nationale de France, Paris, France
 De Menil Collection, Houston, Texas, US
 Foundation Henri Cartier-Bresson, Paris, France
 University of Fine Arts, Osaka, Japan
 Victoria and Albert Museum, London, United Kingdom
 Maison Européenne de la Photographie, Paris, France
 Musée Carnavalet, Paris, France
 Museum of Modern Art, New York City
 The Art Institute of Chicago, Illinois, US
 Jeu de Paume, Paris, France
 J. Paul Getty Museum, Los Angeles
 Institute for Contemporary Photography, New York City
 The Philadelphia Art Institute, Philadelphia, Pennsylvania, US
 The Museum of Fine Arts, Houston, US
 Kahitsukan Kyoto Museum of Contemporary Art, Kyoto, Japan
 Museum of Modern Art, Tel Aviv, Israel
 Moderna Museet, Stockholm, Sweden
 International Photography Hall of Fame, St.Louis, Missouri

Awards
 1948: Overseas Press Club of America Award
 1953: The A.S.M.P. Award
 1954: Overseas Press Club of America Award
 1959: The Prix de la Société française de photographie
 1960: Overseas Press Club of America Award
 1964: Honorary Fellowship of the Royal Photographic Society
 1964: Overseas Press Club of America Award
 1967: The Cultural Award from the German Society for Photography (DGPh), with Edwin H. Land
 1981: Grand Prix National de la Photographie
 1982: Hasselblad Award
 2003: Lifetime Achievement Award from the Lucie Awards
 2006: Prix Nadar for the photobook Henri Cartier-Bresson: Scrapbook

References

Sources
 Assouline, P. (2005). Henri Cartier-Bresson: A Biography. London: Thames & Hudson.
 Galassi, Peter (2010). Henri Cartier-Bresson: the Modern Century. London: Thames & Hudson.
 Montier, J. (1996). Portrait: First Sketch. Henri Cartier-Bresson and the Artless Art (p. 12). New York: Bulfinch Press.
 Warren, J (2005), Encyclopedia of Twentieth-Century Photography. Routledge

External links

 Fondation Henri Cartier-Bresson
 Cartier-Bresson's portfolio at Magnum Photos
 Magnum Photos
 Special Report: Henri Cartier-Bresson (1908–2004) – by Eamonn McCabe in The Guardian
 
 Tête à Tête: Portraits by Henri Cartier-Bresson at the National Portrait Gallery, Washington DC
 Henri Cartier-Bresson at the Metropolitan Museum of Art, NY
 Henri Cartier-Bresson (1908 – 2004): When photography becomes art
 "John Berger pays tribute to his good friend", in The Observer.
 Henri Cartier-Bresson's Cats

1908 births
2004 deaths
20th-century French artists
20th-century photographers
French photographers
French photojournalists
Fine art photographers
Street photographers
Magnum photographers
Lycée Condorcet alumni
French Resistance members
French Army personnel of World War II
French escapees
French prisoners of war in World War II
Escapees from German detention
World War II prisoners of war held by Germany
People from Seine-et-Marne
Photography in China
Photography in India
Photography in Indonesia
Photography in Russia
Photography in the Soviet Union
Humanist photographers
French expatriates in India
Yaddo alumni